Kausar Mohiuddin is an Indian politician from the state of Telangana. He represents the Karwan seat of the Old City of Hyderabad as a candidate of the All India Majlis-e-Ittehadul Muslimeen party.

Political career 
In 2014, Mohiuddin was made a candidate for the Karwan seat for the Assembly election by party chief Asaduddin Owaisi as a replacement for Afsar Khan. Khan was replaced due to health reasons. Times of India wrote that Mohiuddin worked at the grassroot level and "worked in close cooperation with the local legislator". In the election, he defeated his nearest rival Baddam Bal Reddy of the Bharatiya Janata Party by 38 thousand votes.

In July 2017, Mohiuddin objected to the demolition of a 30 feet compound wall in Banjara Hills. The Greater Hyderabad Municipal Corporation officials said that the labourers were abused by him. However the area did not fall under his constituency and he intervened after he received a phone call from the property owner. The GHMC officials claimed that the wall was illegally built.

Personal life 
Mohiuddin was born in Hyderabad and lives in a joint family which includes his five brothers and his mother. He studied at the Anwarul Uloom College of Mallepally. Mohiuddin also has a hobby of visiting his family's agricultural land in Medak.

Mohiuddin's wife Najma Sultana is a corporator from the same party representing the Nanal Nagar constituency.

Controversies 
In March 2017, Mohiuddin was booked for physically assaulting a woman and Muhammad Sharukh, a worker of the Telangana Rashtra Samiti. However, he refuted the allegations and instead said that Sharukh in a drunken state, assaulted his brother.

References 

Living people
Telangana MLAs 2014–2018
1963 births
Telangana MLAs 2018–2023